Beijing Love Story is a 2014 Chinese romance film written and directed by Chen Sicheng adapted from the 2012 Chinese TV series of the same name which was also written and directed by Chen. The film is Chen's film directorial debut. It stars returning cast members Chen and Tong Liya from the TV series alongside new cast members Tony Leung Ka-fai, Carina Lau, Wang Xuebing, Yu Nan, Wang Qingxiang, Siqin Gaowa, Liu Haoran and Nana Ouyang. Despite the same title and sharing the same writer, director and some stars as the TV series, the film is not a continuation of the series and features a new story and characters. It was released on 13 February 2014.

Synopsis
The movie tells the stories of five pairs of lovers, each from a different period of their lives. All five couples, though different in age and circumstance, are somehow linked to one another. Their stories all demonstrate the imperfection of love. Designer Chen Feng (Chen) falls in love with Shen Yan (Tong Liya) at a friend's bachelor party, but finds that he might be too poor to sustain a relationship with her. Chen's boss (Wang Xuebing) cheats with alarming regularity on his dutiful wife (Yu Nan). Vengeful wife tries to cheat with her own employer (Leung), who in turns jets off to Greece for a decadent rendezvous with his mistress (Lau). A young man (Liu Haoran) pines after his cello-playing classmate (Ouyang Nana). His grandfather (Wang Qingxiang) goes on a series of blind dates set up by choir teacher Mrs Gao (Siqin Gaowa).

Cast
Tony Leung Ka-fai as Liu Hui (劉輝)
Carina Lau as Jia Ling (佳玲)
Wang Xuebing as Wu Zheng (吳崢)
Yu Nan as Zhang Lei (張蕾)
Chen Sicheng as Chen Feng (陳鋒)
Tong Liya as Shen Yan (沈彥)
Wang Qingxiang
Siqin Gaowa
Liu Haoran
Nana Ou-Yang
Elaine Jin
Geng Le
Guo Jingfei
Wang Zhifei as Tang Bin (唐斌)

Reception
February 14, 2014, according to incomplete statistics, "Beijing love story" achieved 1.02 million box offices according to the box office charts during nationwide day of the summit, plus 20 million views before the official movie came out, as of February 14, the film "Beijing Love Story"has created five new historical record: Mainland Chinese film history 2D slices highest score, 2D highest grossing Chinese film days, Mainland film history Valentine's Day romance highest grossing, fastest billions of dollars of Chinese history romance, 14:00 Mainland highest grossing movie released. March 8, the film "Beijing love story" box office exceeded 400 million. As of 15 February, it had grossed CN¥117 million and it reached US$65.31 million. The film earned a total of  internationally.

References

2014 films
Chinese romantic drama films
2014 romantic drama films
2010s Mandarin-language films
Films based on television series
Films set in Beijing
Films shot in Beijing
2014 directorial debut films
Films directed by Chen Sicheng